Afyon Kocatepe University is a state university in Afyonkarahisar, Turkey. It was established on July 3, 1992.

Academic units

Faculties
Faculty of Education
Faculty of Fine Arts
Faculty of Economic and Administrative Sciences
Faculty of Technology
Faculty of Veterinary
Faculty of Engineering
Faculty of Arts and Sciences 
Faculty of Law
Faculty of Pharmacy
Faculty of Islamic Sciences
Faculty of Tourism
Faculty of Aeronautics and Astronautics
Faculty of Sport Sciences
Faculty of Applied Sciences

Institutes
Institute of Science
Institute of Health science
Technological Research development and training center

Vocational schools
Afyonkarahisar Vocational School
State Conservatoire
Physical Education and Sport Higher School

Campuses
Ahmet Necdet Sezer Campus
Ali Çetinkaya Campus
Ahmet Karahisari Campus

References

External links
Official website

State universities and colleges in Turkey
Afyonkarahisar
Educational institutions established in 1992
Buildings and structures in Afyonkarahisar Province
1992 establishments in Turkey